Ahore is one of the 200 Legislative Assembly constituencies of Rajasthan state in India. It is in Jalore district.

Members

Election results

2018

See also
List of constituencies of the Rajasthan Legislative Assembly
Jalore district

References

 174 – Ahore Assembly Constituency 

Jalore district
Assembly constituencies of Rajasthan